Calum Gallagher (born 13 September 1994) is a Scottish footballer who plays as a forward for Scottish League One club Airdrieonians.

Career

Rangers
Gallagher came through the Rangers youth system. He played for Alloa Athletic and East Stirlingshire on loan to gain first team experience whilst a youth team player with Rangers. On 15 March 2014, Gallagher made his Rangers debut and scored in a 2–0 victory over Dunfermline Athletic. He joined Cowdenbeath on loan in September 2014.

St Mirren
Gallagher left Rangers in August 2015 and signed a one-year contract with St Mirren. Gallagher scored his first goal for St Mirren in a 3–2 defeat against Livingston in the Scottish League Cup on 25 August 2015. Gallagher scored eight goals in 41 appearances for the club in his first season, and signed a one-year contract extension in May 2016.

Dumbarton
He left St Mirren in January 2017, signing for Scottish Championship rivals Dumbarton on a short-term contract until the end of the season. After making three starts and four substitute appearances, grabbing one assist, he extended his contract until the end of the 2017–18 season in May 2017. Whilst at the Sons, Gallagher scored his first career brace – in a 3–2 Scottish Cup victory against Peterhead in January 2018. After finishing as the club's top scorer with seven for the season as Sons were relegated to Scottish League One, Gallagher signed a new one-year deal in June 2018. In his third season at the club he again finished top scorer, with 14, the best return of his career to date.

Airdrieonians 
Gallagher turned down a new deal with Dumbarton and joined Scottish League One rivals Airdrieonians in June 2019. He was their top scorer in both the 2021–22 and 2022–23 seasons.

Career statistics

Honours 
Scottish League One Player of the Month: April 2019

References

External links

1994 births
Living people
Scottish footballers
Association football forwards
Rangers F.C. players
Alloa Athletic F.C. players
East Stirlingshire F.C. players
Cowdenbeath F.C. players
Scottish Football League players
Scottish Professional Football League players
St Mirren F.C. players
Dumbarton F.C. players
Airdrieonians F.C. players
People educated at St Ninian's High School, Giffnock